The Tice Grammar School (also known as the Tice Elementary School) is a historical school in Tice, Florida, United States. It is located at 4524 Tice Street. On July 8, 1999, it was added to the U.S. National Register of Historic Places.

References

 Lee County listings at National Register of Historic Places
 Florida's Office of Cultural and Historical Programs
 Lee County listings
 Tice Elementary School

External links

 Tice Elementary School - official site

Public elementary schools in Florida
National Register of Historic Places in Lee County, Florida
Schools in Lee County, Florida